The Men's alpine combined competition at the 1972 World Championships was held on 13 February 1972, but it was a paper race.

Alpine Combined event was valid for the World Championships only. No Olympic medals were awarded for this event. Results from all three events of the 1972 Winter Olympics (downhill, slalom, and giant slalom) were translated into FIS points, and then added together to decide the outcome.

Results

See also
 Alpine skiing at the 1972 Winter Olympics

References

External links
 13.02.72. Sapporo Alpine Combined, men

Men's alpine combined